The 22814 / 13 Paradeep–Santragachi Junction Express is a Express train belonging to Indian Railways East Coast Railway zone that runs between  and  in India.

It operates as train number 22814  from Paradeep to Santragachi Junction and as train number 22813 in the reverse direction, serving the states of  Odisha & West Bengal.

Coaches
The 22814 / 13 Paradeep–Santragachi Junction Express has one AC 2 tier, three AC 3 tier, seven sleeper coaches, six general unreserved & two SLR (seating with luggage rake) coaches . It does not carry a pantry car.

As is customary with most train services in India, coach composition may be amended at the discretion of Indian Railways depending on demand.

Service

Timetable

22814 – Paradeep to Santragachi every Monday

22813 – Santragachi to Paradeep every Tuesday

Traction
As the route is electrified, a -based WAP-4 electric locomotive pulls the train to its destination.

References

External links
22814  Paradeep–Santragachi Junction Express at India Rail Info
22813 Santragachi Junction–Paradeep Express at India Rail Info

Express trains in India
Transport in Paradeep
Rail transport in Odisha
Rail transport in West Bengal
Rail transport in Howrah